Adolf Aber (28 January 1893 – 21 May 1960) was a German musicologist and music critic.

Life 
But spent his childhood in Apolda where he was born. His father Emanuel Aber ran a menswear business. His special musical talent was recognized early on. In 1911 he passed his school-leaving examination as a primary school pupil at the Realgymnasium Weimar, which he would only have been able to do in Apolda when he reached full maturity in 1914. In the same year he went to the Berlin University and studied musicology there. Hermann Kretzschmar (1848-1924) became his teacher. His doctoral thesis entitled Die Pflege der Musik unter den Wettinern und wettinischen Ernestinern von den Anfängen bis zur Auflösung der Weimarer Hofkapelle 1662 was considered so important that it was published in book form in 1921.

The concerts of the Gewandhaus Orchestra, the performances of the Leipzig Opera and the St. Thomas Boys Choir in St. Thomas Church provided rich material for his reports. He concluded friendship with many composers, such as for example Richard Strauss.

When the National Socialists came to power Aber emigrated to London with his wife Mignon, née Platky. He became an employee, later publishing director, of the music publishing house Novello & Co. which still exists today, printed the compositions of early Leipzig Thomaskantors, such as Johann Hermann Schein and Johann Kuhnau, and made a name for himself in particular by promoting German music abroad, which was not easy due to the aversion of the English to all things German. Through Aber's dedicated work, the dissemination of folk songs by Franz Schubert, Robert Schumann and Johannes Brahms succeeded. He made contemporary composers like Fritz Jöde and Cesar Bresgen famous in England.

In 1958, on his 65th birthday, he was awarded the Order of Merit of the Federal Republic of Germany for his achievements by President of Germany Theodor Heuss. Afterwards he and his wife were received by Queen Elizabeth II.

On 21 May 1960 Aber died in London at age 67 after a short illness. In an obituary of the publishing house Novello & Co. it says about him: "Adolf Aber - a man of comprehensive culture and stimulating temperament. He will be greatly missed, both in publishing circles and in the large circle of his friends, many of whom are among the most important musicians of our time".

Work 
 1921 Doktorarbeit Die Pflege der Musik unter den Wettinern und wettinischen Ernestinern von den Anfängen bis zur Auflösung der Weimarer Hofkapelle 1662
 1922 Handbuch der Musikliteratur in systematisch-chronologischer Anordnung (issued in 1967 in Hildesheim as reprint)

Literature 
 Ullmann, Dieter: Adolf Aber – ein bedeutender Musikwissenschaftler aus Apolda. Apoldaer Heimat 10 (1992) 23
 Paul Frank / Wilhelm Altmann: Kurzgefasstes Tonkünstler-Lexikon. Heinrichshofen’s Verlag Wilhelmshaven, 15th edition (1936) 
 Friedrich Blume: Die Musik in Geschichte und Gegenwart, Bärenreiter-Verlag Kassel, 1st edition (vol. 1 – 17, 1949–1986) vol.15, ;

References

External links 

 

German music critics
German emigrants to the Kingdom of Great Britain
Commanders Crosses of the Order of Merit of the Federal Republic of Germany
1893 births
1960 deaths
People from Apolda
20th-century German musicologists